Paul Murray (born 1975) is an Irish novelist, the author of the novels An Evening of Long Goodbyes, Skippy Dies and The Mark and the Void.

Biography
Murray was born in Dublin in 1975, the son of a professor of Anglo-Irish Drama at University College Dublin and a teacher. Murray attended Blackrock College in south Dublin, an experience that would later provide the basis for the school in Skippy Dies. He studied English literature at Trinity College, Dublin, and subsequently completed his master's in creative writing at the University of East Anglia.  He also spent time in Barcelona as an English teacher, a time he did not enjoy, describing it as "a brief and unhappy stint teaching English to a Catalan businessman, who pointed out many faults in my grammar I had not known about hitherto". He describes Gravity's Rainbow as a very influential book to him.

Novels
Murray has written three novels: his first, An Evening of Long Goodbyes, was shortlisted for the Whitbread First Novel Prize in 2003 and nominated for the Kerry Group Irish Fiction Award. His second novel Skippy Dies was longlisted for the 2010 Booker Prize and shortlisted for the 2010 Costa Prize, the Bollinger Everyman Wodehouse Prize for Comic Fiction and the National Book Critics Circle Award for Fiction. It was also #3 on Time magazine's top ten works of fiction from 2010. His latest novel, The Mark and the Void, was one of Time'''s top ten best fiction books for 2015, and joint winner of the Bollinger Everyman Wodehouse Prize in 2016.

Metal Heart
Murray wrote the screenplay for 2018 Irish film Metal Heart, which was directed by Hugh O'Conor.

List of works
 An Evening of Long Goodbyes (2003)
 Skippy Dies (2010)
 The Mark and the Void (2015)
 The Bee Sting'' (2023)

References

1975 births
Living people
Alumni of Trinity College Dublin
Alumni of the University of East Anglia
People educated at Blackrock College
Writers from Dublin (city)
21st-century Irish novelists
Irish male novelists
21st-century Irish male writers